Lake Témiscouata is a lake in the Témiscouata region of southeastern Quebec, Canada. It is 40 km long, with a total area of 66 km². The Madawaska River flows from this lake to the Saint John River.

The cities of Témiscouata-sur-le-Lac, Dégelis and Saint-Juste-du-Lac are located on this lake. Forestry is a major industry in this area.

The Petit Témis Interprovincial Bicycle Path, runs from Rivière-du-Loup, Quebec to Edmundston, New Brunswick, following an abandoned railway line along the lake.

The lake is theorized to be the inspiration for the nearby parish of Saint-Louis-du-Ha! Ha!. One explanation suggests the archaic French word haha, here meaning an unexpected obstacle or abruptly ending path, as the lake is an extremely long and particularly formidable obstacle to travel.

References

External links
 

Temiscouata